The Journal of the Ancient Near Eastern Society (JANES) is a biannual peer-reviewed academic journal. It was established in 1968 as The Journal of the Ancient Near Eastern Society of Columbia University, and since 1980 it has been housed at the Jewish Theological Seminary of America. The most recent issue appeared in 2020. The journal is abstracted and indexed in ATLA Religion Database.

References

External links 
 

Religious studies journals
Publications established in 1968
Biannual journals
Academic journals associated with universities and colleges
Academic journals associated with learned and professional societies
Jewish Theological Seminary of America
Columbia University academic journals
Publications disestablished in 2010